Euzophera albicostalis is a species of snout moth in the genus Euzophera. It was described by George Hampson in 1903. It is found in Russia, India and Iran.

The wingspan is about 26 mm. The forewings are pale brown, irrorated (sprinkled) with fuscous. The hindwings are pale brown, tinged with fuscous towards the costa.

References

Moths described in 1903
Phycitini
Moths of Asia